Falling Skies was renewed for a fifth and final season, which began airing June 28, 2015 and concluded August 30, 2015.

Plot
In the aftermath of the destruction of the Espheni power core, the Espheni occupation of Earth is faltering. All forms of mechanized technology the Espheni have deployed including airships, mech robots, and harnesses have gone offline, and the remaining Espheni forces have begun retreating from the 2nd Mass and resistance groups around the world. In the midst of space, Tom finds himself rescued by a mysterious alien race named the Dornia, or the "Great Enemy", who are the Espheni's greatest enemy and the reason for their intergalactic expansion. They communicate with Tom using a memory of his wife Rebecca and later directly while still using the image of Rebecca, influencing him to show no mercy against the Espheni. They return him to Earth, where Tom leads the 2nd Mass on a series of raids against key Espheni locations in an effort to dismantle their war machine before they can restore power to their mechs and ships on the Earth. But along the way, the 2nd Mass face discontent from within and lose important members of the team.

The 2nd Mass learn of militias fighting against the Espheni worldwide with the help of the Volm, who also inform them that the Espheni are active in several capital cities around the world, and have placed jamming signals to prevent them from learning exactly what they're doing. They come to learn that the final battle against the Espheni could be in Washington D.C. and they begin a slow march towards the city. Along the way Tom learns that the Dornians were the first race the Espheni destroyed, and the skitters that they've been fighting were once Dornians until the Espheni transformed them into their servants. Pope and Sara begin a romance that is short-lived when she is stuck and killed in an Espheni trap; Pope blames Tom for her death when he chose to destroy a facility that was mass-producing skitters instead of saving her. Tom, sick of Pope's constant complaining and vitriol, kicks him out of the 2nd Mass; several others including Anthony go with him. The 2nd Mass come across a naval station currently occupied by a group of soldiers under the command of female captain named Katie Marshall with whom Weaver once had a relationship. Tom and his sons are imprisoned for conspiring with the Espheni; Anne is eventually arrested as well once the soldiers learn that her daughter was half-Espheni. Weaver becomes suspicious of Katie's behavior, noting that she's not acting like her normal self (to which other soldiers agree); he follows her off-base one night and finds her talking to an overlord which he then kills after she leaves. Katie, under the orders of the overlord, tries and convicts Tom and his family of aiding the enemy and orders their execution. Weaver, along with other soldiers convinced that Captain Marshall isn't herself, refuse to carry out the execution. When Katie tries to shoot them herself, Weaver fatally stabs her. Katie dies shortly afterward, confessing that she wasn't the real Katie but an Espheni doppelganger sent to infiltrate human resistance groups. 

Tom is again contacted by the Dornia, who provide him with a powerful bio-weapon to use against the Espheni. Ben, who has been listening to overlord communications through a recovered Espheni communication device, learns that the Espheni are ruled by a queen who has come to Earth to oversee the occupation and has made the Lincoln Memorial her base. Tom tells Anne and the others about the Dornian weapon, and they are unsure if they should use it not knowing how it might affect humans. Anne and other scientists manage to alter the weapon so it only targets Espheni, leaving humans unharmed. Its effectiveness is proven on an Espheni clone of Alexis Glass-Mason who is sent to assassinate Tom.

After learning that Washington, D.C. is too well defended for a direct attack on the queen, Tom instead leads a strike team in through service tunnels while the rest of the militias attack a defensive wall built to keep them out as a distraction. After an explosion separates them, Tom continues on alone and finally comes face to face with the Espheni queen in the ruins of the Lincoln Memorial. There, the queen explains that the attack on Earth is in revenge for a failed attempt 1,500 years before that led to the death of her daughter. Tom infects himself with the Dornia bioweapon as the queen drains his blood, infecting and killing her. The bioweapon spreads through the Espheni and their various slave races and wipes them out, freeing the Earth. Anne dies of injuries sustained in the assault, but the Dornia resurrect her as thanks. Months later, humanity gathers at the Lincoln Memorial to select a new leader for the now-united race.

Cast and characters

Main cast
 Noah Wyle as Tom Mason (10 episodes)
 Moon Bloodgood as Anne Glass-Mason (10 episodes)
 Drew Roy as Hal Mason (10 episodes)
 Connor Jessup as Ben Mason (10 episodes)
 Maxim Knight as Matt Mason (10 episodes)
 Colin Cunningham as John Pope (8 episodes)
 Sarah Sanguin Carter as Maggie (10 episodes)
 Mpho Koaho as Anthony (8 episodes)
 Doug Jones as Cochise (10 episodes)
 Will Patton as Colonel Dan Weaver (10 episodes)

Recurring cast
 Mira Sorvino as Sara (3 episodes)
 Jennifer Ferrin as Dornia/Rebecca Mason (5 episodes)
 Catalina Sandino Moreno as Isabella (6 episodes)
 Treva Etienne as Dingaan Botha (10 episodes)
 Taylor Russell as Evelyn (5 episodes) 
 John DeSantis as Shaq (3 episodes)
 Todd Weeks as Marty (4 episodes)

Guest cast
 Megan Danso as Deni (1 episode)
 Scarlett Byrne as Alexis "Lexi" Glass-Mason (2 episode)
 Julia Sarah Stone as Caitlin (2 episodes)
 Melora Hardin as Captain Katie Marshall (2 episodes)

Episodes

Production

Development
Falling Skies was renewed for a fifth and final 10 episode season which premiered on June 28, 2015.

Casting

On October 17, 2014, it was announced that Catalina Sandino Moreno had joined the cast in a major recurring role as a character called Isabella. Her character has been described as an academic prior to the invasion, who joins the group after posing as a nurse.

Filming

Principal photography began on September 15, 2014, and concluded on January 27, 2015.

Ratings

References

External links
 

 
 
2015 American television seasons